Sandra Greaves (born June 17, 1963 in St. Boniface, Manitoba) is a retired judoka from Canada, who won the gold medal in the women's middleweight (– 66 kg) competition at the 1987 Pan American Games, and many more nation-wide competitions. She was also the first female judoka to represent Canada at the Olympics, competing in both 1988 and 1992. For

See also
 Judo in Ontario
Judo in Canada
 List of Canadian judoka

References
 Profile

1963 births
Living people
Canadian female judoka
Judoka at the 1988 Summer Olympics
Judoka at the 1992 Summer Olympics
Olympic judoka of Canada
Sportspeople from Winnipeg
People from Saint Boniface, Winnipeg
Pan American Games gold medalists for Canada
Pan American Games medalists in judo
Judoka at the 1987 Pan American Games
Medalists at the 1987 Pan American Games
20th-century Canadian women
21st-century Canadian women